Underwater! is a 1955 adventure film directed by John Sturges and starring Jane Russell and Richard Egan.

Plot synopsis
Johnny and his wife Theresa, along with mercenary Dominic Quesada, priest Father Cannon and Gloria, the boat owner, search for sunken treasure in the Caribbean. While on a dive they come across a wreck that they assume holds treasure. When they resurface they are confronted by a local boat of shark hunters with an unhealthy curiosity in their activities. In their effort to find funding to raise the wreck they discover that what they are looking for is a 17th-century ship that contains a life-size solid gold Madonna encrusted in precious gems and that it lies in a different underwater location. So they make plans  to acquire it. However, it is on the edge of a precipice in shark-infested waters, and they are not the only ones after it.

Cast
Jane Russell – Theresa Gray
Richard Egan – Johnny Gray
Gilbert Roland – Dominic Quesada
Lori Nelson – Gloria
Robert Keith – Father Cannon
Joseph Calleia – Rico Herrera
Eugene Iglesias – Miguel Vega
Ric Roman – Jesus

Production
Howard Hughes acquired the rights to the unpublished The Big Rainbow.

Partially filmed on location in Mexico and Hawaii, Underwater! was completed in a newly constructed underwater tank in an RKO Radio Pictures soundstage. It was the first RKO film released in  Superscope. The film's budget increased from its initial $300,000 and a large amount of the budget was used on footage cut from the film.

Lori Nelson claimed Howard Hughes wanted her for the lead and paid Universal Pictures for her use; however, Jane Russell owed RKO a film.  The lead was given to Russell with a part written for Nelson so she could keep her fee.

Soundtrack 
The film contained the songs "Cherry Pink and Apple Blossom White" and "Rhythm Sticks" performed by Perez "Prez" Prado and his Orchestra ("The King of the Mambo").

Release
For its world premiere on January 10, 1955, the film was projected on a submerged movie screen at Silver Springs, Florida, and members of the press viewed the film 20 feet underwater while wearing aqualungs.

The song "Cherry Pink and Apple Blossom White" featured in the film became a major hit.

See also
List of American films of 1955

References

Works cited

External links

1955 films
1950s action adventure films
American action adventure films
Films directed by John Sturges
Films scored by Roy Webb
Films set in the Caribbean
Films shot in Hawaii
Films shot in Mexico
RKO Pictures films
Treasure hunt films
Underwater action films
1950s English-language films
1950s American films